The 1925 Geneva Covenanters football team was an American football team that represented Geneva College as a member of the Tri-State Conference during the 1925 college football season. Led by first-year head coach Bo McMillin, the team compiled an overall record of 6–3 with a mark of 5–0 in conference play, winning the Tri-State title.

Schedule

References

Geneva
Geneva Golden Tornadoes football seasons
Geneva Covenanters football